Dr. Sun Yat-sen is a 1986 Chinese drama film directed by Ding Yinnan. The film was selected as the Chinese entry for the Best Foreign Language Film at the 59th Academy Awards, but was not accepted as a nominee.

Cast

Liu Wenzhi as Sun Yat-sen
Liu Simin as Huang Xing
Ma Hongying as Wang Jingwei
Zhang Yan as Soong Ching-ling
Wang Yansong as Song Jiaoren
Zhang Shihui as Chiang Kai-shek
Xin Jing as Yuan Shikai
Shen Weiguo as Chen Jiongming
Wang Yongge as Zhu Zhixin
Ruan Zhiqiang as Hu Hanmin
Ren Chao as Liao Zhongkai
Yu Zijian as Li Dazhao
Wang Zhen as Mao Zedong
Shinya Owada as Tōten Miyazaki
Ryoko Nakano as Mrs. Miyazaki
Wang Shihuai as Chen Qimei
Sun Guolu as Soong Ai-ling
Yu Luosheng as Charlie Soong
Tang Tangmin as Zheng Shiliang
Kazuo Kamiya as Shu Hirayama
Isao Hashimoto as Nagatomo Kayano
Taiji Kodama as Ryōhei Uchida
Xu Weihong as Lu Haodong
Sun Sujie as Empress Dowager Longyu
Tang Aimei as Liza Roos
Shinji Ogawa
Chiharu Iwamoto

See also
 List of submissions to the 59th Academy Awards for Best Foreign Language Film
 List of Chinese submissions for the Academy Award for Best Foreign Language Film

References

External links
 

1986 films
1986 drama films
1980s historical drama films
Chinese historical drama films
Films set in the 1910s
1980s Mandarin-language films
Cultural depictions of Sun Yat-sen
Cultural depictions of Chiang Kai-shek
Cultural depictions of Mao Zedong
Works about the 1911 Revolution